José Rodrigo Andrade Ramos (born 3 February 1997), known as Rodrigo Andrade, is a Brazilian footballer who plays as defensive midfielder for Guarani, on loan from Vitória.

Club career

Paysandu
Rodrigo Andrade was a Paysandu youth graduate, and was promoted to the first team in December 2015. He made his senior debut on 27 March 2016, coming on as a first-half substitute and scoring the second in a 3–0 Copa Verde home win against Fast Clube.

Rodrigo Andrade made his Série B debut on 14 May 2016, starting in a 2–2 away draw against Ceará. After featuring in 14 league matches, he signed a contract extension until 2020 on 25 January 2017.

Vitória
On 7 February 2018, Rodrigo Andrade signed a three-year contract with Série A side Vitória, which bought 50% of his federative rights.

Career statistics

Honours
Paysandu
Campeonato Paraense: 2016
Copa Verde: 2016

References

External links

1997 births
Living people
Brazilian footballers
Association football midfielders
Campeonato Brasileiro Série B players
Paysandu Sport Club players
Esporte Clube Vitória players
Centro Sportivo Alagoano players
Guarani FC players
Sportspeople from Belém